RTMA may refer to:

Radio Television Manufacturers Association, a US electronics association between 1950 and 1953, successor to RMA and predecessor to EIA
Rav Teitz Mesivta Academym a  Yeshiva high school in New Jersey, USA since 1955